The pontine cistern, also cisterna pontis and cisterna pontocerebellaris is a notable subarachnoid cistern on the ventral aspect of the pons.

It contains the basilar artery, and is continuous behind with the subarachnoid space of the spinal cord, and with the cisterna magna, and in front of the pons with the interpeduncular cistern.

References 

Meninges